was a Japanese samurai of the Sengoku period . He is known as one of the "Twenty-Four Generals of Takeda Shingen".

Mitsuyori was a native of the Mino Province. He first served under the daimyō Takeda Nobutora, but later on served under Takeda Shingen, Nobutora's son.

It is known that Mitsuyori fought in over 29 battles under Shingen, some of them being Battle of Sezawa (1542) and Siege of Uehara (1542). Mitsuyori was very skilled at night warfare. In which he put to good use at battle of Sezawa. In 1563, Mitsuyori died of illness.

References

External links 
  "Legendary Takeda's 24 Generals" at Yamanashi-kankou.jp

Takeda retainers
Samurai
1501 births
1563 deaths